is a character franchise created by Sony Creative Products in 1983.

An OVA series based on the products titled  was produced by Sony Music Entertainment Japan and animated by Group TAC. The episodes were released between 1988 and 1990. All episodes, except the first, had two episodes put on a single cassette. The OVAs (except the first) aired on MBS and TBS under the name  from July 3, 1993 to August 28, 1993. An anime movie, titled , was released in the same year. An additional 29 episodes were created and broadcast in 1994 on the same networks under the same name. The original series was licensed by 4Kids Entertainment in 2000 and dubbed into English. This dub was syndicated in late 2001 but never made it to home video. The original series is currently licensed in the US by Crunchyroll.

A new series of animated shorts began airing in October 2016. It is animated in Adobe Flash. In 2016, an official Korean version of the same name based on the series, created by Daewon Media, SEGA SAMMY GROUP and produced by Toonzone Studios & CJ ENM, was released worldwide for a Western audience.

A new anime television series titled Uchi Tama!? ~Uchi no Tama Shirimasen ka?~ by MAPPA and Lapin Track premiered from January 9 to March 19, 2020 on Fuji TV's Noitamina programming block.

Characters

Original characters
Tama

 is an energetic cat who always wants to go on new adventures. Tama is owned by Takeshi Okamoto.
Pochi

 (Doozle in the 4Kids dub) is a timid, yet tenderhearted dog who is Tama's best friend.
Momo

 is a sweet and ladylike cat. Momo is owned by Emi Hanasaki. Tama has a secret crush on her.
Tora

 (Tiggle in the 4Kids dub) is a troublemaker that wants to convince his peers to try daredevil stunts.
Beh

 (Chopin in the 4Kids dub) is a black cat that knows all of the shortcuts and hidden places in the town. His English dub name, Chopin, originates from Frédéric Chopin.
Kuro

 (Wocket in the 4Kids dub) is a hyperactive, athletic dog.
Gon

 (Bengbu in the 4Kids dub) is a dog who is laid-back, often resting on the chair by his owner's shop.
Koma

 (Pimmy in the 4Kids dub) is the youngest member of Tama's group. Her owner runs the local bathhouse.
Nora

 (Rockney in the 4Kids dub) is a street-smart stray cat. He previously had an owner who died of an unknown illness.
Bull

 (Bupkus in the 4Kids dub) is a bulldog that bullies Tama's group and has a crush on Momo.
Takeshi Okamoto

 (Casey in the 4Kids dub) is Tama's owner, who enjoys riding his bicycle and stargazing.
Emi Hanasaki

 (Amy in the 4Kids dub) is Takeshi's friend and the owner of Momo. Her mother owns a flower shop and cafe.

Episode list

Series overview

Tama and Friends: Third Street Story

Tama of Third Street: Have You Seen My Tama?

Tama & Friends: Do You Know My Tama?
 began airing on Tokyo MX and CTV in October 2016.<ref>{{cite web|url=http://www.excite.co.jp/News/release/20160721/Atpress_107859.html|script-title=ja:22年ぶりの新作アニメ『タマ＆フレンズ ～うちのタマ知りませんか？～』いよいよ10月、放送開始が決定！|trans-title=After 22 years, a new Tama & Friends: Do You Know My Tama?" anime is set to begin airing in October!|language=ja|date=July 21, 2016|publisher=Excite.co.jp|access-date=September 16, 2016|url-status=dead|archive-url=https://web.archive.org/web/20160917093032/http://www.excite.co.jp/News/release/20160721/Atpress_107859.html|archive-date=September 17, 2016}}</ref>

Uchitama?! Have you seen my Tama?
 is a spin-off series created in 2017, which reimagines the cast of the franchise as humans. In June 2019, an anime adaptation by MAPPA and Lapin Track was announced. It aired on Fuji TV's Noitamina block from January 9 to March 19, 2020. The series is directed by Kiyoshi Matsuda, with Kimiko Ueno handling series composition, Mai Otsuka designing the characters, and Tom-H@ck composing the music. wacci performed the series' opening theme song "Friends" while Soma Saito performed the ending theme . Aniplex of America licensed the series in North American territories.

Video games
The first Tama and Friends'' video game,  was released in 1989 for the Famicom Disk System.

The second game,  was released in July 1994 for the Sega Pico.

The third game,  was released in August 1994 for the Game Boy.

The fourth game,  was released in 1995 for the Game Gear.

References

External links
Official website 
Official English website (Archive)
Official UchiTama Anime Website 

1988 anime OVAs
1989 video games
1993 anime films
1994 anime television series debuts
1994 video games
1995 video games
2006 anime television series debuts
2020 anime television series debuts
4Kids Entertainment
Aniplex franchises
Crunchyroll anime
Japanese children's animated adventure television series
Bandai games
Famicom Disk System games
Famicom Disk System-only games
Flash cartoons
Group TAC
Japan-exclusive video games
Mascots introduced in 1983
Seinen manga
Sega video games
Tom Create games
MAPPA
Noitamina
Video games developed in Japan